Ohrid Summit 2008 was the name of the 15th Meeting of Presidents of Central European States that took place from 2 May to 3 May 2008 in the city of Ohrid, Republic of Macedonia. Prior to the summit, the President of the Republic of Macedonia, Branko Crvenkovski, said the Macedonians "will be especially honored as the host of the greatest political event ever organized" in his country.

Participant countries and presidents

 Albania, Bamir Topi
 Austria, Heinz Fischer
 Bosnia and Herzegovina, Haris Silajdžić
 Bulgaria, Georgi Parvanov
 Croatia, Stjepan Mesić
 Czech Republic, Václav Klaus
 Germany, Horst Köhler
 Hungary, László Sólyom
 Italy, Giorgio Napolitano
 Macedonia (2008 host nation), Branko Crvenkovski
 Moldova, Vladimir Voronin
 Montenegro, Filip Vujanović
 Poland, Lech Kaczyński
 Romania, Traian Băsescu
 Serbia, Boris Tadić
 Slovakia, Ivan Gašparovič
 Slovenia, Danilo Türk
 Turkey, Abdullah Gül
 Ukraine, Viktor Yushchenko

See also

 Ohrid
 Republic of Macedonia

External links
Official site of the Ohrid Summit 2008

Central Europe
Ohrid
2008 in the Republic of Macedonia